The 2015 Seguros Bolívar Open Pereira was a professional tennis tournament played on clay courts. It was the seventh edition of the tournament which was part of the 2015 ATP Challenger Tour. It took place in Pereira, Colombia between 8 September and 4 October.

Singles main-draw entrants

Seeds

 1 Rankings are as of September 20, 2015.

Other entrants
The following players received wildcards into the singles main draw:
  Mateo Andres Ruiz Naranjo
  Daniel Elahi Galán
  Nicolás Barrientos
  Alejandro Gomez

The following players received entry from the qualifying draw:
  Daniel Mora
  Luis David Martínez
  Felipe Escobar
  Michel Vernier

Doubles main-draw entrants

Seeds

 1 Rankings are as of September 20, 2015.

Other entrants
The following pairs received wildcards into the doubles main draw:
  Iván Endara /  Daniel Elahi Galán
  Juan Montes /  Felipe Rojas
  Alejandro Gomez /  Felipe Escobar

Champions

Singles

 Paolo Lorenzi def.  Alejandro González, 4–6, 6–3, 6–4

Doubles

 Andrés Molteni /  Fernando Romboli def.  Marcelo Arévalo /  Juan Sebastián Gómez, 6–4, 7–6(14–12)

External links
Official Website

Seguros Bolivar Open Pereira
Seguros Bolívar Open Pereira
2015 in Colombian tennis